Kakha Gogoladze (born 4 February 1968) is a Georgian and Turkmen (since 2001) association football coach and former international player. He is currently a coach in FC Dinamo Tbilisi.

Club career 
He played in the Georgian clubs Merani, Guria, Shevardeni. In 1996 he left for Turkmenistan, where he played for FK Köpetdag Aşgabat. In 1998, he left Turkmenistan, but continued to play for the national team. Since 2001, he played in Kazakhstan for Irtysh Pavlodar and FC Batys.

In 2004 he returned to Georgia, where he completed his career as a player of Chikhura Sachkhere.

National team 
Having adopted the citizenship of Turkmenistan, he began to play for the Turkmenistan national football team. He played in the qualifying games for the World Cup 1998 and World Cup 2002. Played 5 matches and scored 4 goals.

References

External links 
 
 
 Profile at FC Dinamo Tbilisi

1968 births
Living people
Soviet footballers
Turkmenistan footballers
Turkmenistan international footballers
Turkmenistan expatriate footballers
Expatriate footballers in Uzbekistan
Expatriate footballers in Kazakhstan
Expatriate footballers in Armenia
Expatriate footballers in Turkmenistan
Footballers from Georgia (country)
Expatriate footballers from Georgia (country)
Association football forwards